The crested ibis (Nipponia nippon), also known as the Japanese crested ibis, Asian crested ibis or toki, is a large (up to  long), white-plumaged ibis of pine forests, native to eastern Asia. Its head is partially bare, showing red skin, and it has a dense crest of white plumes on the nape. It is the only member of the genus Nipponia.

Breeding
They make their nests at the tops of trees on hills usually overlooking their habitat.

Diet
Crested ibises usually eat insects, frogs, small fish, and small animals.

Distribution
At one time, the crested ibis nested in the Russian Far East, Japan, and Mainland China, and was a non-breeding visitor to the Korean Peninsula and Taiwan. It has now disappeared from most of its former range, and the only natural (non-reintroduced) population occurs in Shaanxi, China.

Conservation
The last wild crested ibis in Japan died in October 2003, with the remaining wild population found only in Shaanxi Province of China, until the reintroduction of captive bred birds back into Japan in 2008. They were previously thought to be extinct in China as well, until their rediscovery in 1981.
Extensive captive breeding programs have been developed by Japan and China to conserve the species. They are on China's State Protection List. In 2002, there were a total of 130 colonies in China. Northwest Shaanxi province's research center has a history of 26 crested ibis fledglings including artificial and natural incubation. On July 31, 2002, five out of seven crested ibis chicks hatched at an incubation center in northwest Shaanxi province. This was the highest ever recorded number of chicks that hatched. The parents of the chicks were chosen from 60 ibis pairs raised at that research center.

In 1980s, each birds were decimated by overhunting, uses of pesticides, ongoing habitat loss, small population size, limited range, winter starvation and persecution brought the endangered species to the brink of extinction. The crested ibis has been listed in Appendix I of the conservation treaty CITES.

The London Zoo had crested ibises from 1872 until 1873. Outside China, only Japan and South Korea currently keep the species.

Reintroductions

Japan
On September 25, 2008 in Sado, Niigata, the Sado Japanese Crested Ibis Preservation Center released 10 of the birds as part of its crested ibis restoration program, which aimed to introduce 60 ibises into the wild by 2015. It was the first time the bird has returned to the Japanese wild since 1981.

On April 23, 2012, it was confirmed that three crested ibis chicks had hatched on Sado Island in Niigata Prefecture, the first time chicks had hatched in the wild in Japan in 36 years.

On June 23, 2022, nearly five hundred tokis returned to Sado, where the bird's delicate pink plumage and distinctive curved beak now draw tourists. It's a rare conservation success story when one in eight bird species globally are threatened with extinction, and involved international diplomacy and an agricultural revolution on a small island off Japan's west coast.

South Korea
On the Korean Peninsula, the bird has not been present since it was last seen in 1979 near the Korean Demilitarized Zone (DMZ). South Korea made efforts to restore the species after former Chinese President Hu Jintao delivered a pair of the birds as a present during a South Korea–China summit in 2008, and President Xi Jinping presented another pair in 2013. The restoration center in Changnyeong has bred more than 360 crested ibises so far. The South Korean government has released dozens of crested ibises into the wild to promote its efforts to preserve biological diversity.

See also
 List of Special Places of Scenic Beauty, Special Historic Sites and Special Natural Monuments – the crested ibis is listed

References

External links

 
 Japanese crested ibis at www.biodic.go.jp
 Sibagu: Threskiornithidae of China
 Sibagu: Threskiornithidae of Japan
 
 
 
 
 

crested ibis
Birds of China
Birds of Japan
Birds of Korea
crested ibis